Gabriel España (born December 23, 1988, in Miguel Hidalgo, Mexico City) is a former professional Mexican footballer who last played for Atlante.

External links
 
 Gabriel España Pérez at Ascenso MX 
 

1988 births
Living people
Footballers from Mexico City
Association football defenders
Mexican footballers
Chiapas F.C. footballers
Atlante F.C. footballers
C.F. Mérida footballers
Club Atlético Zacatepec players